Messer may refer to: 

 Messer (surname), a list of people and a fictional character
 Messer (weapon), a class of single-edged sword
 Messer, Oklahoma, United States, an unincorporated community
 Messer Group, a gas supply company from Germany
 Messer (band), an American hard rock band
"Messer", a nickname for Messerschmitt airccaft
Messer (artist), American electro-pop project of musician Mitch Grassi

See also
 The Messers, an alternate name for the 1895 film Partie de cartes
 Messer Street Grounds
 Messor, an ant genus
 Messier (disambiguation)